Nolte is a surname that may refer to:

Bill Nolte (born 1953), U.S. singer and stage actor
Carl Nolte (born ?), U.S. journalist
Charles Nolte (1923–2010), U.S. actor and educator
Claudia Nolte (born 1966), German politician
Dorothy Nolte (1924–2005), U.S. writer and family counselor
Edwin Nolte, (1885-1940) U.S. politician, Missouri senator
Eric Nolte (born 1964), U.S. baseball pitcher
Ernst Ferdinand Nolte (1791–1875), German botanist
Ernst Nolte (1923–2016), German historian and philosopher
Georg Nolte (born 1959), German jurist
Harry Nolte (born 1961), German Olympic sprint canoer
Jan Nolte (born 1988), German politician
Jerry Nolte (born 1955), U.S. politician, educator, and commercial artist
Jürgen Nolte (born 1959), German Olympic fencer
Kay Nolte Smith (1932–1993), U.S. writer
Nick Nolte (born 1941), U.S. actor
Pierre Nolte, South African singer and songwriter known by the artistic name Valiant Swart
Richard Nolte (1920–2007), U.S. diplomat and analyst
Roeland J. M. Nolte (born 1944), Dutch chemist
Vincent Otto Nolte, author of Fifty Years in Both Hemispheres, or Reminiscences of the Life of a Former Merchant (1854, translated from the German)
Zelda Nolte (1929-2003), South African-British sculptor

See also
Nolte State Park, U.S. park in Cumberland, Washington state

German-language surnames